It is the 2022–23 season of the Women's Football team of Galatasaray Sports Club.

Overview

August
In the notification made on 10 August 2022, it was announced that the ways were parted with the Technical Director Nurcan Çelik, whose contract had expired.

On 11 August 2022, it was announced that an agreement was reached with Metin Ülgen for the position of Technical Director.

October
Group draw and fixtures in the Turkish Women's Football Super League were held on 6 October 2022 in Istanbul with the participation of Federation officials and club representatives.

Kits

Supplier: Nike
Name sponsor: Petrol Ofisi
Main sponsor: Petrol Ofisi

Back sponsor: Tunç Holding
Sleeve sponsor: Arzum

Short sponsor: —
Socks sponsor: Polar Dış Ticaret

Squad information

Transfers and loans

Contracts renewals

In

Out

Loan in

Loan out

Management team

Pre-season and friendlies

Pre-season

Mid-season

Competitions

Overall record

Turkish Women's Football Super League

League table ( Group B )

Results summary

Results by matchday

Matches

Play–offs

Statistics

Appearances and goals

Goalscorers

Assists

Clean sheets

Disciplinary records

Game as captain

References

External links
 Galatasaray Kadın Futbol Takımı - GALATASARAY.ORG 
 Galatasaray Kadın Futbol Takımı (@kadinfutbolGS) _ Twitter 

Galatasaray Sports Club 2022–23 season
Galatasaray S.K. (women's football) seasons
Galatasaray